Bhagwan Birsa Biological Park (also known as Ranchi Zoo) is located off [chakla village]Ormanjhi in Ranchi, Jharkhand, India.

Ranchi Zoo was established in 1994 at the bank of Getalsud Dam and on the main Patna-Ranchi highway. The park has two divisions the zoological section is dedicated in 83 hectare and botanical section is spread over 21 hectare.

Facilities
The Zoo has a dedicated veterinary doctor and a trained compounder available 24 x 7 to monitor health issues of animals, well established pathology lab for animals is present in the park which includes a separate ward dedicated for complete treatment of animals and emergency ward for rescued animals or newly arrived ones.

Zoo also offers Battery Operated Vehicles and Boating facility to visitors including other facilities like Drinking water, Rest Area with Sheds at regular interval, First Aid Box, Wheel Chair for Physical Challenged person, Toilets and Lavatories, Direction Map and Sign Board for navigation, Information Center for visitors, Kiosks, Service, Guide Map and Canteen Facility.

Initiatives
The zoo also boasts a program for adoption of animals to give them better facilities. Various organisations and celebrities also adopted animals in Ranchi Zoo. Priyanka Chopra, adopted tigress Durga & lioness Sundari even organisations like MECON and PNB also adopted few animals.

References

Zoos in India
1994 establishments in Bihar
Zoos established in 1994